Hitesh Solanki (born 3 November 1991) is an Indian cricketer who plays for Baroda. He made his List A debut for Services in the 2016–17 Vijay Hazare Trophy on 4 March 2017. In October and November 2021, Solanki played for Burgher Recreation Club in the 2021–22 Major Clubs Limited Over Tournament in Sri Lanka.

References

External links
 

1991 births
Living people
Indian cricketers
Baroda cricketers
Services cricketers
Burgher Recreation Club cricketers
People from Vadodara